Batteries Not Included is the fourth and final album of all-new material released by UK band After the Fire.  The official release date is March 19, 1982, however some sources on the Internet claim a late 1981 release date (the first two singles from this album, Dancing in the Shadows and Frozen Rivers, were released in 1981).  "Dancing in the Shadows" would later become a minor U.S. hit, after it was featured on the band's lone American album release, ATF (which was released as Der Kommissar outside of the U.S.).

Track listing

Side one
"Short Change"  (3:19)
"Frozen Rivers"  (3:30)
"Sometimes"  (3:07)
"Sailing Ship"  (3:54)
"I Don't Understand Your Love"  (2:50)
"The Stranger"  (3:43)

Side two
"Rich Boys"  (3:01)
"Carry Me Home"  (3:21)
"Dancing in the Shadows"  (3:02)
"Space Walking"  (3:11)
"Gina"  (1:37)
"Stuck in Paris (Nowhere To Go)"  (2:45)
"Bright Lights"  (3:32)

External links
 After The Fire discography at afterthefire.co.uk

After the Fire albums
1982 albums
Albums produced by Reinhold Mack
Albums recorded at Record Plant (New York City)
CBS Records albums